1717 Broadway is a skyscraper in the Midtown Manhattan neighborhood of New York City. The building contains two hotels, the Courtyard New York Manhattan/Central Park below the 35th floor and the Residence Inn New York Manhattan/Central Park on floors 35 and higher, with a total of 639 rooms. The glass-clad building is on the northwest corner of 54th Street and Broadway.

See also
List of tallest buildings in New York City
List of tallest hotels in the world

References

External links
Courtyard New York Manhattan/Central Park
Residence Inn New York Manhattan/Central Park

Skyscraper hotels in Manhattan
Broadway (Manhattan)
Hotel buildings completed in 2013
2013 establishments in New York City

Midtown Manhattan